Bullet is the name of the horse that is ridden by the "Spirit Rider" at Oklahoma State University-Stillwater football games and other special events.  The current Bullet is a black American quarter horse stallion. Bullet was introduced as an Oklahoma State tradition in 1984 by the late Dr. Eddy Finley as part of the Spirit Rider Program. Bullet gallops out onto the football field at Boone Pickens Stadium, ridden by the Spirit Rider carrying an orange OSU flag, during the pre-game performance by the Cowboy Marching Band and after every Cowboy touchdown. The current Bullet is the fifth horse used in the OSU Spirit Rider program, and the fourth horse to be named Bullet.

The first Spirit Rider horse, a black mare named Della, was owned by John Beall Jr., who served as the original Spirit Rider at OSU. When Beall left OSU, the university decided to keep the tradition alive. In 1988, the school bought its own black horse and through a contest put on by the school newspaper, The Daily O'Collegian, and  won by OSU Senior Scott Townsend, "Bullet" was adopted as the name of the horse. In 2003, Bullet I was retired and OSU broke in another black horse to roam the sidelines. Bullet II died shortly before the beginning of the 2005 football season and was replaced by a third Bullet. Bullet III was retired during halftime of the OSU WVU game November 17th, 2018. Bullet IV was also introduced during halftime.

In addition to riding Bullet during football games, the Spirit Rider is charged with the task of taking care of the horse, such as cleaning Bullet's stall at the OSU Equine Center, feeding and exercising Bullet every day and bathing Bullet three times a week.

In 2001, Bullet was one of three finalists for the MD Barns Silver Spur Award presented by the American Quarter Horse Association. The award honors American Quarter Horses that have made a significant impact on the lives of others and created a favorable perception of the breed.

References

Oklahoma State Cowboys and Cowgirls
Big 12 Conference mascots
Horse mascots